Love in Sadness  is a 2019 South Korean television series starring Ji Hyun-woo, Park Han-byul, Ryu Soo-young and Wang Bit-na. It is a remake of the 1999 TBS drama  Beauti. The series aired four episodes every Saturday on MBC TV from February 23 to April 27, 2019.

Synopsis
Yoon Ma-ri (Park Ha-na/Park Han-byul) is in an unhappy marriage with Kang In-wook (Ryu Soo-young), an abusive, and obsessively possessive husband who is also a chaebol. She meets Seo Jung-won (Ji Hyun-woo), a kind-hearted plastic surgeon. After seeing the abuse she receives, Seo Jung-won operates on her face to help her start a new life with a new identity.

Cast

Main
 Ji Hyun-woo as Seo Jung-won (37 years old)
 Park Han-byul as Yoon Ma-ri (37 years old) 
 Ryu Soo-young as Kang In-wook (38 years old)
 Wang Bit-na as Joo Hae-ra (37 years old)

Supporting

People around Jung-won
 Moon Hee-kyung as Lim Yeon-hwa (64 years old)
Jung-won's mother. She used to be a doctor.

Seo & Ha Plastic Surgery
 Go Joo-won as Ha Seong-ho (37 years old)
Director of Seo & Ha Plastic Surgery. Jung-won's friend and rival.
 Hwang Jung-in as Park Na-yeon (28 years old)
She's a nurse.
 Park Sang-shin as Kim Bong-woo (34 years old)
He's an anesthesiologist.

People around Ma-ri
 Kim Yeong-ryeong as Lee Kyung-hee (10 years old)
Ma-ri's mother.
 Kim Yun-joo as Choi Woo-sun (32 years old)
Mari's friend. She works at an Art Academy.

People around In-wook
 Jeong Won-jung as Gang Il-guk (66 years old)
In-wook's father. He's the president of Geonha Group.
 Kook Jung-sook as Moon Hye-sook (52 years old)
In-wook's stepmother.
 Jung Sung-hoon as Kang In-sang (17 years old)
In-wook's half-brother.
 Kang Sung-wook as Kim Secretary (29 years old)
In-wook's secretary.
 Go Woo-ri as Oh Cheol-young (32 years old)
Former detective employed by In-wook.

People around Hae-ra
 Heo Eun-jeong as Eun Jung (22 years old)
She works at the Gyeong Gallery.

Special appearances
 Park Ha-na as former Yoon Ma-ri
 Kim Beop-rae as Divorce Lawyer (Ep.36)

Production
 The series is written by Song Jung-rim (Miss Ajumma, Secrets of Women) and directed by Choi Yi-sub (Miss Ripley, Working Mom Parenting Daddy) and Yoo Beom-sang.
 The first script reading took place in late November 2018 at MBC Broadcasting Station in Sangam, South Korea.

Comparisons with Let Me Introduce Her

Ahead of its premiere, netizens were comparing Love in Sadness with the 2018 SBS TV weekend drama Let Me Introduce Her.

Ratings
 In this table,  represent the lowest ratings and  represent the highest ratings.
 N/A denotes that the rating is not known.

Notes

References

External links
  
 
 

2019 South Korean television series debuts
Korean-language television shows
MBC TV television dramas
South Korean melodrama television series
2019 South Korean television series endings
South Korean television series based on Japanese television series